Krishnamachari Balaji (24 June 19342 May 2009) was an Indian film producer and actor. He was a prominent actor in  the 1960s and 70s, playing lead, supporting and antagonist roles. He appeared in many Sivaji Ganesan films.

Early life
Balaji was born to Krishnamachari and Janaki Devi in Chennai, Tamil Nadu. He was the grandson of colonial era advocate T. Rangachari. 
He started acting at an early age, when he performed in school plays and amateur theatre shows.

Career 
Balaji contacted S. S. Vasan, then owner of Gemini Studios in 1951, looking for work. He was offered a minor role in Auvaiyar, in which he played the Hindu god Muruga.

Balaji soon understood that he was better off playing a villain or the hero's understudy with a negative angle in films that included Padithaal Mattum Podhumaa, Bale Pandiya, En Kadamai and Thillana Mohanambal.

While working as an actor, he was hired as a manager in Narasu Studios in the southwest suburbs. In the 1960s, after coming into contact with top Hindi actors such as Ashok Kumar, Dilip Kumar and Tamil stars Sivaji Ganesan, Gemini Ganesan and actress Savithri, he began to remake Hindi hits in Tamil. His first production was Annavin Aasai, a remake of Chand Aur Sooraj directed by  Dulal Guha. The debut production film starred Gemini Ganesan and Savithri in the lead.

He then went on to remake popular Hindi films such as Dushman (1971) and Namak Haraam (1973) both starring Rajesh Khanna, Deewaar (1975), and Qurbani.

He founded Sujatha Cine Arts in 1966. He was also the founder of Sujatha Recording Studio, where sound recordings for most of the big-budget movies of the 1980s and '90s were done.

In 1979 began to produce films in Hindi, including the successful Amardeep.

Family 
His wife Anandavalli died in 1996. The couple had three children, Suresh Balaje, Sujatha and Suchitra Mohanlal. Malayalam actor Mohanlal Viswanathan is his son-in-law. He was also the grandfather of Pranav Mohanlal and Suraj Suresh. The comedian Y. G. Mahendran is his nephew through his cousin sister Rajalakshmi Parthasarathy.

Death
Balaji died on 2 May 2009 evening due to multiple organ and kidney failure. He had been hospitalised for over a month.

Partial filmography

As producer

As actor

References

External links 

2009 deaths
Film producers from Chennai
Tamil film producers
1934 births
Male actors in Malayalam cinema
Male actors in Tamil cinema
Male actors from Chennai
Indian male film actors
Male actors in Hindi cinema